Chiraps is a genus of moths belonging to the subfamily Tortricinae of the family Tortricidae.

Species
Chiraps alloica (Diakonoff, 1948)
Chiraps excurvata (Meyrick, in de Joannis, 1930)
Chiraps paterata (Meyrick, 1914)
Chiraps phaedra (Diakonoff, 1983)

See also
 List of Tortricidae genera

References

 , 1971, Ent. Ber. 31: 36.
 , 2005, World Catalogue of Insects 5.

External links
 Tortricidae.com

Archipini
Tortricidae genera
Taxa named by Alexey Diakonoff
Taxa named by Józef Razowski